William Welles Bosworth (May 8, 1869 – June 3, 1966) was an American architect whose most famous designs include the Massachusetts Institute of Technology Cambridge campus, the original AT&T Building in New York City, and the Theodore N. Vail mansion in Morristown, New Jersey (1916, now the Morristown Town Hall). Bosworth was also responsible to a large degree for the architectural expression of Kykuit, the Rockefeller family estate in Pocantico Hills, New York, working closely with the architects William Adams Delano and Chester H. Aldrich, and the interior designer Ogden Codman.

Bosworth is not as well known in the United States as other Beaux-Arts architects of that time, because his career, under the auspices of John D. Rockefeller, Jr., led him to France in the 1920s, where he was put in charge of the restoration of the Palace of Versailles, of the Palace of Fontainebleau and of the rebuilding of the roof of the cathedral Notre-Dame de Reims, projects Rockefeller was interested in and that he financed. In time, Bosworth was awarded the French Legion of Honour and the French Cross of the Commander of the Order of Arts and Letters, one of the few Americans ever to receive such honors. In 1918, Bosworth was elected into the National Academy of Design as an Associate member, and became a full member in 1928.

Early life and education

Bosworth was born in 1868 in Marietta, Ohio, and received his architectural training at the Massachusetts Institute of Technology, at the time one of the leading Beaux-Arts oriented schools in the United States. He took a trip to Europe with William Robert Ware, who was the editor of the American Architect. Afterwards, he went back to London to learn more about Georgian Architecture with Sir Lawrence Alma-Tadema, who was a well-known classical artist. In 1896, Bosworth left for Paris to study at the famous École des Beaux-Arts. Attending the École was a necessity for anyone who wanted to make a name for himself in the US, especially during the years following the World's Columbian Exposition of 1893 in Chicago. Richard Morris Hunt, H. H. Richardson before him as well as Ernest Flagg, Charles McKim, John Merven Carrère and John Russell Pope, had all studied in Paris.

Architectural career

Upon his return to the United States in 1900 Bosworth worked for the firm Carrère and Hastings, which had recently won the competition for the design of the New York Public Library, their most significant and best-known project. In 1906 Bosworth was called in to design a garden for the prominent philanthropist, the New Yorker Valentine Everit Macy, who lived at Scarborough-on-Hudson. This led to Bosworth's acquaintance with Frank Vanderlip (1864–1937), president of the City Bank of New York, and former assistant Secretary of the Treasury under President William McKinley. Bosworth designed for Vanderlip a gate for his family estate north of Tarrytown, New York. He also designed a schoolhouse not far from Vanderlip's estate, the Scarborough School, still extant. At about the same time, Vanderlip was appointed to the board of Letchworth Village, an institution for epileptics and the mentally ill founded in 1907. Vanderlip called in Bosworth to lay out the village with its various schools and residences. It is located across the Hudson from Scarborough on a hill not far from the current town of West Haverstraw. For the Rockefellers he designed the gardens and main facade of Kykuit, transforming a barren treeless site overlooking the Hudson into a lush and spectacular Beaux-Arts garden.

In 1912, Theodore Newton Vail (1845–1920) gave Bosworth his largest and most visible commission yet: the corporate headquarters of AT&T Corporation, located on a prestigious site in downtown New York City at 195 Broadway, just a few blocks from Wall Street. It was a modern steel structure clad top to bottom in a Greek-styled exterior, the three-story-high Ionic columns of Vermont granite forming eight registers over a Doric base. In 1913, Bosworth received the commission to design the new campus of the Massachusetts Institute of Technology in Cambridge, MIT having outgrown its old buildings near Copley Square in Boston. The plan featured a large paved court (now called Killian Court) that is now, however, planted with grass and trees, at the head of which was a domed structure modeled on the Pantheon in Rome in the manner of the Altes Museum in Berlin.  At the time it was the largest non-governmental building in the US.

Although some of Bosworth's subsequent American commissions were office buildings, like the Ocean Cable Office Building (1916) (since demolished), most were houses, estates, and townhouses. This included houses for William Barclay Parsons (at 121 East 65th Street) and Philip Gossler (at 14 East 65th Street) in New York. In the Locust Valley area of Long Island, commissions included "Mallow" (1920), a mansion for Walter Farwell which now houses the East Woods School, and house alterations and a garden for Charles A. Stone. Vail, who was a great admirer of Italian art and had traveled extensively through Italy, asked Bosworth in 1916 to design his home in Morristown, New Jersey.  Bosworth also designed extensive gardens for the house of Samuel Untermyer, a famous lawyer in Yonkers, New York. In 1925 he designed the unbuilt Egyptian Museum for Cairo. In 1921 Bosworth built his own house, "Old Trees," on Long Island next to that of Stone, inviting the sculptor Gaston Lachaise, with whom he had worked on the AT&T building, to carve four reliefs representing the four seasons out of sandstone.

Bosworth's American career, promising as it was, came to an end when he moved to France. John D. Rockefeller Jr. traveled in France in 1923, became appalled at the dire condition of French monuments, and made a donation of one million dollars in 1924, supplemented by another two millions in 1927 to pay for the restoration of the Palace of Versailles and the Palace of Fontainebleau, as well as the rebuilding of the roof of the cathedral Notre-Dame de Reims. Bosworth was named Secrétaire Général of the "Comité Franco-Américain pour la Restauration des Monuments", a Committee created by John D. Rockefeller Jr. to supervise his donations. The five members were selected by the philanthropist and appointed by French President Raymond Poincaré. Former French ambassador to the United States Jean Jules Jusserand was given the presidency of this Committee, while American banker Henry Herman Harjes becames its treasurer. The other two members were former Minister for Foreign Affairs Gabriel Hanotaux and historian and diplomat Maurice Paléologue who was also president of the Société des Amis de Versailles.

Later life
Although the Rockefeller project ended in 1936, Bosworth remained in his adopted country in semi-retirement, building a house (Villa Marietta) for himself and his family in Vaucresson (1935–1936). He was very active in animating the American Colony in Paris and founded the University Club of Paris in 1935. During WWII, Bosworth was chairman of the Paris committee of the American Volunteer Ambulance Corps. In 1945, he was named membre étranger of the Académie des beaux-arts. In 1949 he headed a fund drive for restoration of the village of Vimoutiers, which had been destroyed by an Allied bombing raid during the battle of Normandy. These efforts earned him considerable recognition in France.

Bosworth died at his home in suburban Vaucresson on June 3, 1966.

See also
Rockefeller family

References
Notes

Bibliography
Chafee, Richard. The Architecture of the École des Beaux-Arts. New York: Museum of Modern Art, 1977.
Jacobs, S. Quentin. William Welles Bosworth: Major Works. Master's Thesis, Columbia University, 1988.
Jarzombek, Mark. Designing MIT: Bosworth’s New Tech. Northeastern University Press, 2004.
MacKay, Robert B., Anthony K. Baker, and Carol A. Traynor. Long Island Country Houses and Their Architects, 1860–-1940. New York: W. W. Norton and the Society for the Preservation of Long Island Antiquities, 1997.
Pasquier, Eglantine. L’architecte comme conseiller : William Welles Bosworth et la philanthropie architecturale de John D. Rockefeller, Jr. en France pendant l’entre-deux-guerres. Thèse de doctorat en histoire de l'architecture, Université Paris 1 Panthéon-Sorbonne, École du Louvre, 2022.
Pasquier, Eglantine. "John D. Rockefeller, Jr. et la Maison internationale de la Cité universitaire de Paris : la place du mécène dans la conception et la mise en œuvre d’un projet architectural". Profils, revue de l’association d’histoire de l’architecture, no. 2, 2020, p.68-79. 
Pasquier, Eglantine. "Un Américain au Louvre ? L’architecte W.W. Bosworth et le réaménagement du musée du Louvre dans le cadre du « plan Verne » (1925-1939)". Les Cahiers de l’École du Louvre, no. 11, automne 2017.
Roberts, Ann Rockefeller. The Rockefeller Family Home: Kykuit. Photographs by Mary Louise Pierson; captions and additional text by Cynthia Altman. New York: Abbeville Publishing Group, 1998.
Seebohm, Caroline. Paradise on the Hudson: The Creation, Loss, and Revival of a Great American Garden. Portland, Oregon: Timber Press, 2020.

External links

20th-century American architects
MIT School of Architecture and Planning alumni
People from Marietta, Ohio
1869 births
1966 deaths
Architecture firms based in New York City
Beaux Arts architects
American alumni of the École des Beaux-Arts
19th-century American architects
Architects from Ohio